How Bizarre is the only album by the New Zealand musical group OMC, released in 1996. It was first released on 27 September under the Huh! recording label, issued by PolyGram New Zealand, and manufactured and marketed by Mercury Records on 25 February 1997 in the United States. The album garnered a surprised, but generally positive reaction from critics; it was considered so bold and unique that it could not be compared to anything, and journalists struggled to classify it as one thing or another. How Bizarre reached number 5 in its native New Zealand and number 40 on the Billboard 200, spawning four singles: the title track, "Right On", "On the Run" and "Land of Plenty". It was also certified Gold by the Recording Industry Association of America (RIAA), denoting sales of over 500,000 copies in that country, becoming the best-selling Urban Pasifika album.

How Bizarre was reissued globally on vinyl for the first time on April 16, 2021, remastered by Alan Jansson.

Critical reception

Critical reception was mixed to positive. Chuck Eddy, writing for Spin, praised the overall musicianship throughout the album, highlighting the update to the "angelic-melancholy-through-odd-instrumentation aesthetic" pioneered by Flying Nun Records, and Fuemana's vocal performance resembling that of Billy Ocean and R. B. Greaves. Eddy said OMC crafted a genre hybrid that mixes Beck from 1996, reggae from 1971 and recent pop music that "dour mid-'90s U.S. radio might not know what to do with it." Thom Owens of AllMusic called the record "an intriguing fusion of worldbeat rhythms and urban soul that never manages to catch fire, despite several strong grooves and soulful fusions." Robert Christgau cited the title track and "On the Run" as "choice cuts", indicating good songs on "an album that isn't worth your time or money.". Both Q Magazine and Mojo magazine gave the album four out of five stars and it was named Album of the Year by publications in Japan and the Philippines.

Track listing

 Track 11 was only on the second release of this album, issued in September 1997 in the US only.

Personnel
Adapted from the album's liner notes.

OMC
Pauly Fuemana – vocals, guitar
Alan Jansson – engineering, keyboards, programming, guitar ("Right On")

Additional musicians
Sina Saipaia – backing vocals ("How Bizarre", "Right On")
Lee Baker – guitar ("How Bizarre", "Right On")
Hershal Herscher – accordion ("How Bizarre")
George Chisholm – trumpet ("How Bizarre", "Right On")
Glenn Campbell – pedal steel guitar ("Right On"), dobro guitar ("Breaking My Heart")
Geoffrey Heath – cello ("Pours Out Your Eyes")
Steve Robinson – piano ("Pours Out Your Eyes"), hammond organ ("Land of Plenty")
Steve Kellner – drums ("Pours Out Your Eyes", "She Loves Italian")
Mia Camilleri – french horn ("Pours Out Your Eyes", "Land of Plenty")

Walter Bianco – saxophone ("Breaking My Heart")
Harmon – tea chest bass ("Breaking My Heart")
Taisha – backing vocals ("Land of Plenty")
Christine Fuemana – backing vocals ("Land of Plenty")
James Gaylyn – drums ("Angel in Disguise")
Juliet Primrose – violin ("Angel in Disguise")
Manuel Bundy – scratching ("Lingo with the Gringo")

Production
Rick Huntington – additional mixing and engineering

Artwork
Deborah Smith – photography
Richard Kingsford – design

Charts and certifications

Weekly charts

Year-end charts

Certifications

References

1996 albums
OMC (band) albums
PolyGram albums
Mercury Records albums